KRFA-FM (91.7 FM) is a radio station licensed to Moscow, Idaho. The station is owned by Washington State University, and is the flagship station of  Northwest Public Broadcasting's "NPR and Classical Music" service.

The station debuted on December 13, 1963, as KUID-FM, operated by the University of Idaho as a service of the UI Department of Communications.  It was Idaho's first educational radio station.  Due to a funding crisis, UI transferred control of the station to WSU in 1984 under its current call letters. The acquisition of KRFA allowed NWPR to split its offerings into a two-channel network, with KRFA taking most of flagship KWSU's classical music programming.

NWPR operates KUID's old studio on the UI campus as a satellite studio.

References

External links
nwpr.org

RFA-FM
RFA-FM
Classical music radio stations in the United States